Kupin may refer to:

Places
Kupin, Elbląg County, village in northern Poland 
Kupin, Iława County in Warmian-Masurian Voivodeship (north Poland)
Kupyn, village in Ukraine

Medicine
KUPIN, a mnemonic for causes of high anion gap metabolic acidosis